Delaware is an unincorporated community in Delaware Township, Ripley County, in the U.S. state of Indiana.

History
Delaware was platted in 1870. An old variant name of the community was called Rei.

A post office was established at Delaware in 1838, and operated until 1933.

Geography

References

Unincorporated communities in Ripley County, Indiana
Unincorporated communities in Indiana